The 1995–96 Botola was the 40th season of the Moroccan Premier League. Raja Casablanca won the title.

References

Morocco 1995–96

Botola seasons
Morocco
Botola